SS Dearne was a freight vessel built for the Lancashire and Yorkshire Railway in 1909.

History

She was built by Swan Hunter and Wigham Richardson in Neptune Yard, Low Walker for the Lancashire and Yorkshire Railway and launched on 10 February 1909 by Mrs Atkin, wife of Captain Atkin RNR.

On 17 February 1913, the Goole dockers’ strike started on the Dearne when 100 unionists stopped first on the Dearne and then marched to other steamers. In total 400 workers went on strike.

Served mainly on Hamburg route and left on her last voyage for the Lancashire and Yorkshire Railway on 25 July 1914. She began her return passage from Hamburg, but was sent back to discharge part of her cargo and was seized by Germany. . She then operated for the German Government until she was torpedoed on 22 December 1915.

References

1909 ships
Steamships of the United Kingdom
Ships built on the River Tyne
Ships of the Lancashire and Yorkshire Railway